Yaltyrkulbash (Yaltırqulbaş) is a rural locality (a village) in Kilimovsky Selsoviet, Buzdyaksky District, Bashkortostan, Russia. The population was 10 as of 2010. There is 1 street.

Geography 
Yaltyrkulbash is located 29 km north of Buzdyak (the district's administrative centre) by road. Yakupovo is the nearest rural locality.

References 

Rural localities in Buzdyaksky District